"Love in Motion" is the first new material released by the Australian rock synthpop band Icehouse as a 7" vinyl single-only in October 1981 on Regular Records for the Australian market. The band had been known as Flowers until 27 June 1981 after which they changed their name to Icehouse, they had signed to Chrysalis Records and most of Flowers' material was released under the new name into Europe, UK and US markets. "Love in Motion" peaked at #10 on the Australian singles charts. The B-side, "Goodnight, Mr. Matthews" was included on the 1982 album Primitive Man with "Love in Motion" included on the Chrysalis Records US / European versions of the album, the UK 1983 version of the album was re-titled Love in Motion.

Both tracks of the single were written by the Flowers/Icehouse founder and mainstay Iva Davies who recorded the tracks while Icehouse were on tour in London using the Sequential Circuits Prophet-5, and produced them with Steve Nye. In 1992, Icehouse released a compilation album Masterfile on Massive Records, which included the Davies duet with Christina Amphlett of Divinyls on "Love in Motion" also released as a CD-single. A 1996 Icehouse compilation was called Love in Motion and released by dIVA / Massive Records. A remix version by Wicked Beat Sound System was released on the Icehouse album Meltdown in 2002.

Track listing
All tracks written by Iva Davies.

1981 single (Australian/NZ release)
 "Love in Motion" - 3:41
 "Goodnight, Mr. Matthews" - 4:00

1992 single (featuring Christina Amphlett)
 "Love in Motion" (single edit)
 "Love in Motion" (7" with Lenin version)
 "Crazy" (original version)
 "Love in Motion" (original Laswell version)

Charts

Weekly Charts

Year-end charts

References

1981 singles
1992 singles
Icehouse (band) songs
Songs written by Iva Davies
1981 songs
Regular Records singles